Jacob Israel Murillo Moncada (born 31 March 1993) is an Ecuadorian footballer who plays for Náutico as a winger.

International goals 
Scores and results list Ecuador's goal tally first.

Honours
LDU Quito
Copa Ecuador: 2019

References

External links

Jacob Murillo at FEF

1993 births
Living people
Ecuadorian footballers
Ecuador international footballers
Ecuadorian expatriate footballers
Ecuadorian Serie A players
Argentine Primera División players
C.D. Olmedo footballers
Delfín S.C. footballers
L.D.U. Quito footballers
Estudiantes de La Plata footballers
Expatriate footballers in Argentina
Association football midfielders